Mesonia sediminis is a Gram-negative and facultatively anaerobic bacterium from the genus of Mesonia which has been isolated from sediments from a pond which was cultivated with sea cucumber from Rongcheng in China.

References

Flavobacteria
Bacteria described in 2016